Between Wars is an Australian 1974 drama/war film released on 15 November 1974. It was directed by Michael Thornhill and written by Frank Moorhouse.

Plot

Four episodes in the life of doctor Edward Trenbow:
In 1918 Trenbow is treating shell-shocked soldiers from the front.
In the 1920s he works as a psychiatrist at the Sydney insane asylum and becomes involved in experiments in Freudian psychiatry, which bring him to the attention of a Royal Commission.
In the 1930s he works as a doctor in a small country town and becomes involved in a fight against the New Guard.
In 1939 he is working in Sydney as a psychiatrist and tries to defend a German psychiatrist who is being interned as a member of the Australia First Movement.

Cast
Corin Redgrave as Dr Edward Trenbow
Judy Morris as Deborah Trenbow
Gunter Meisner as Dr Karl Schneider
Arthur Dignam as Dr Peter Avante
Patricia Leehy as Marguerite
Jone Winchester as Deborah's mother
Brian James as Deborah's father
Reg Gillam as Trenbow's father
Betty Lucas as Trenbow's mother
Neil Fitzpatrick as Lance Backhouse

Production
Director Michael Thornhill was good friends with writer Frank Moorhouse and they had worked together on several short films. Moorehouse wrote the script in 1970, originally for television and it was revived a few years later. Half the budget came from the Australian Film Development Corporation and the other half from a property developer.

Filming took place over six weeks in February and March 1974 with interiors at the former studios of Cinesound Productions at Bondi and locations in Gulgong and Melbourne. It was the first feature from cinematographer Russell Boyd.

Release
Thornhill decided to distribute the film himself at first. Initial reviews were good but the box office performance was not strong and distribution was taken over by the Vincent Library. The movie did not return its cost.

Home Media
Between Wars was released on DVD by Umbrella Entertainment in January 2011. The DVD is compatible with all region codes.

Awards
In 1976, the Australian Cinematographers Society awarded the film's cinematographer Russell Boyd with Cinematographer of the Year award for the film.

References

External links

Between Wars review at The New York Times
Between Wars at Oz Movies

1974 films
1970s war drama films
Australian war drama films
Works by Frank Moorhouse
Films set on the home front during World War II
1974 drama films
1970s English-language films
Films directed by Michael Thornhill